The 5th Dimension was a dark ride at the Chessington World of Adventures Resort in southwest London, England, when the theme park opened and was the first major special effects attraction of its kind in the UK. The ride closed at the end of the 1993 season and was replaced by Terror Tomb, which in turn has been replaced by Tomb Blaster. The ride was designed with cars that could stop and rotate to face what was happening in the scene; the same transit system is in use today.

History
The ride opened in the summer of 1987, designed and produced by Madame Tussauds Studios and originally sponsored by Hitachi. The ride followed the character of "computer trouble shooter" robot Zappomatic, through a series of eclectic scenes set inside a malfunctioning computer generated reality, with large scale animations and special effects. The layout and format of transit system was designed by John Wardley and manufactured by Mack Rides.

Upon its initial opening, The 5th Dimension was considered a disappointment by the park management because it did not attract enough attendance. Once in the ride, guest reception was largely positive but with confusion about its narrative thread. The ride was extensively redesigned for its second season to make it more appealing to younger visitors, including rewriting Zappomatic as a TV repair robot on a mission to defeat a virus named "The Gorg". This allowed the ride to operate for another six seasons, until being replaced by Terror Tomb in 1994.

See also
Chessington World of Adventures Resort
Terror Tomb
Tomb Blaster

References

External links

Restored on-ride recording from 1988
The 5th Dimension documentary with the ride's 1987 designers

Dark rides
1987 establishments in England
1993 disestablishments in England
Chessington World of Adventures past rides